The 2010 Huntingdonshire District Council election took place on 6 May 2010 to elect members of Huntingdonshire District Council in Cambridgeshire, England. One third of the council was up for election and the Conservative Party stayed in overall control of the council.

After the election, the composition of the council was:
Conservative 37
Liberal Democrats 12
UK Independence Party 2
Independent 1

Background
After the last election in 2008 the Conservatives continued to run the council with 38 councillors, while the Liberal Democrats had 12 and there were 2 independents. However, in July 2009 the UK Independence Party won their first seat on the council after Peter Reeve won a by-election for Ramsey ward, taking the seat from the Liberal Democrats. He was then joined by the other Ramsey councillor, Andy Monk, who had been elected at another by-election in April 2009 as a Conservative, but defected to the UK Independence Party in January 2010.

Meanwhile, the Liberal Democrats gained a seat from the Conservatives in another by-election in Fenstanton in February 2010. These changes meant that going into the 2010 election there were 36 Conservative, 12 Liberal Democrat, 2 UK Independence Party and 2 independent councillors.

Election result
The Conservatives increased their majority on the council by 1 to have a majority of 22 seats on the council.

Ward results

References

2010 English local elections
May 2010 events in the United Kingdom
2010
2010s in Cambridgeshire